The Asian Television Awards (launched in 1996), is an appreciation to recognize and reward programming and production excellence in the Asian television industry. Held every December, the Awards comprises 56 categories across news, documentaries & current affairs, kids and animation, entertainment, drama, technical, digital as well as performances including acting and directing. The Awards draw about 1,400 entries each year from a wide range of broadcasters, including free-to-air TV stations, pay-TV platforms, OTT platforms as well as many independent production houses in Asia. Every year, a panel of more than 50 judges from more than 10 countries evaluate and select the entries.The winners are then awarded across 3 evenings: a Gala Dinner in Kuching for the technical and creative categories followed by a live telecast the next day for the entertainment and acting categories, also in Kuching. The digital awards are presented separately in another country.

Asian TV Awards was founded in 1996.

Award Categories

Short Video and Social Categories
 Best Short Form Video Series - Scripted
 Best Short Form Video Series - Unscripted
 Best Branded Content
 Best Music Video
 Best Influencer - Health, Beauty & Fitness
 Best Influencer - Travel & Lifestyle
 Best Influencer - Sports and Gaming

Digital Categories
 Best Single Digital Programme/Short Film
 Best Digital Non-Fiction Programme/Series
 Best Digital Fiction Programme/Series
 Best Original Digital Drama Series
 Best Original Digital Entertainment Programme
 Best Leading Male Performance - Digital
 Best Leading Female Performance - Digital
 Best Host/Presenter - Digital

Technical and Creative Categories
 Best Cinematography
 Best Direction (Non-Fiction)
 Best Direction (Fiction)
 Best Editing
 Best Original Screenplay
 Best Theme Song
 Best Scriptwriting

Performance Categories
 Best News Presenter or Anchor
 Best Current Affairs Presenter
 Best Entertainment Presenter/Host
 Best Sports Presenter/Commentator
 Best Actor in a Leading Role
 Best Actress in a Leading Role
 Best Actor in a Supporting Role
 Best Actress in a Supporting Role

Best Programming Categories
 Best Documentary Programme (one-off/special)
 Best Documentary Series
 Best Natural History or Wildlife Programme
 Best News Programme
 Best Single News Story/Report (10min or less)
 Best Current Affairs Programme
 Best Drama Series
 Best Single Drama or Telemovie
 Best Comedy Programme
 Best Children's Programme
 Best Preschool Programme
 Best Entertainment (one-off/annual)
 Best General Entertainment Programme
 Best Game or Quiz Programme
 Best Music Programme
 Best Reality Show
 Best Infotainment Programme
 Best Talk Show
 Best Social Awareness Programme
 Best Adaptation of an Existing Format
 Best Lifestyle Programme
 Best 2D Animated Programme
 Best 3D Animated Programme
 Best Live Sports Coverage
 Best Sports Programme

Grand Awards

Performance Categories

Winners

1996

2000

2001

2002

2003

2004
 Best Documentary Programme (30 minutes or less) : "Body Snatchers of Bangkok" from National Geographic Channel (Asia)
 Best Documentary Programme (31 minutes or more) : "Mysterious Hanging Coffins of China" from Discovery Channel and "50 Years of Overseas Adoption of Korean Children" from Munhwa Broadcasting Channel 11 (Joint winners)
 Best Natural History or Wildlife Programme : "Face to Face with the Ice Bear" from NHK Digital Hi-Vision Channel
 Best News Programme : Channel i News from SPH MediaWorks Channel i
 Best Single News Story/Report (10 minutes or less) : Terrorist Bombing of UN Headquarters in Iraq from NHK General TV Channel
 Best News/Current Affairs Special : "Family Bond – Give Us Back Our Father" from Tokyo Broadcasting System
 Best Current Affairs Programme : The Impeachment of President Roh from Munhwa Broadcasting Channel 11
 Best Social Awareness Programme : "Pijar" from PT Surya Citra Televisi
 Best Comedy Programme : "Bubble Gang" from GMA Network Channel 7 (Philippines)
 Best Entertainment (One-off/Annual) : MTV Asia Award 2004 from MTV Networks Asia
 Best Entertainment Programme : "Masquerade" from Nippon Television Network
 Best Drama Series : "Damo: The Legendary Police Woman" from Munhwa Broadcasting Channel 11
 Best Docu-drama : "HONKOWA – True Horror Stories" from Fuji Television
 Best Reality Programme : "Dunia Lain – Lawang Sewu" PT Televisi Transformasi Indonesia
 Best Game or Quiz Programme : "Fan Pan Tae" from Royal Thai TV Channel 5
 Best Music Programme : "Shi-Bu-Ki" from Yomiuri Telecasting Channel 10
 Best Talk Show : "The Big Fight – Has the Time Come to End the Beauty Contest" from New Delhi Television NDTV 24X7
 Best Live Event Coverage : Big [V] Concert frin Star India, Channel [V]
 Best Children's Programme : "Fruity Pie – Lin Lin's Story" from Public Television Service
 Best Infotainment Programme : "Love House" from Munhwa Broadcasting Channel 11
 Best Animation : "Gokusen" from Nippon Television Network
 Best Single Drama/Telemovie : "Our Memories of the Sugarcane Field" from Tokyo Broadcasting System

2005
 Best Documentary Programme (30 minutes or less) : "Building Site" from Dalian Television, China
 Best Documentary Programme (31 minutes or more) : "Little School Children" from Shanghai Media Group, Dragon TV, China
 Best Natural History or Wildlife Programme : "A Flash of Blue" from NHK Digital Hi-Vision Channel
 Best News Programme : Waves of Destruction from NDTV 24X7, India
 Best Single News Story/Report (10 minutes or less) : "Rebel Impasse" from Ocean Vista Films Ltd, Hong Kong
 Best Current Affairs Programme : "FTV's Hall of Dissent" from Formosa Television, Channel 53, Taiwan
 Best Social Awareness Programme : "i-Witness: The GMA Documentaries – Skin and Bones (Buto't Balat)" from GMA Channel 7, Philippines
 Best Comedy Programme : "Daddy’s Girls – Lulu’s Special Strawberry Cream Cake" written by Ong Su Mann.
 Best Entertainment (One-off/Annual) : "Eat Bulaga! Silver Special" from GMA Network, Philippines
 Best Entertainment Programme : "Masquerade" from Nippon Television, Japan
 Best Drama Series : "Damo: The Legendary Police Woman" from Munhwa Broadcasting Corporation 11, South Korea
 Best Docu-drama : "HONKOWA – True Horror Stories" from Fuji Television, Japan
 Best Reality Programme : "Dance Competition" PT Televisi Transformasi Indonesia
 Best Game or Quiz Programme : "Fan Pan Tae" from Royal Thai TV Channel 5
 Best Music Programme : "Shi-Bu-Ki" from Yomiuri Telecasting Channel 10
 Best Talk Show : "Macam Macam Aznil" from Astro Ria, Malaysia
 Best Live Event Coverage : Big [V] Concert frin Star India, Channel [V]
 Best Children's Programme : "Fruity Pie – Lin Lin's Story" from Public Television Service
 Best Infotainment Programme : "Love House" from Munhwa Broadcasting Corporation 11, South Korea
 Best Animation : "Pozzie" from Nippon Television, Japan
 Best Single Drama/Telemovie : "Our Memories of the Sugarcane Field" from Tokyo Broadcasting System, Japan
 Best Terrestrial Channel of the Year : GMA Network, Inc., Philippines

2006
Programming
 Best Documentary Programme (30 minutes or less) : "My Treasures" by Shanghai Media Group, Documentary Channel (China)
 Best Documentary Programme (31 minutes or more) : "You are My Destiny" by Munhwa Broadcasting Corp (MBC) (Korea)
 Best Natural History or Wildlife Programme : "Korea Last Survivor – Mystery Uncovered "Copper-winged Bat" by Korean Broadcasting System (Korea)
 Best News Programme : "CNN Today" by CNN International (Hong Kong)
 Best Single News Story/Report (10 minutes or less) : "Hunger Deaths" by New Delhi Television Limited, NDTV 24x7 (India)
 Best Current Affairs Programme : "Uncovering the Scientific Fraud of the Century" by Munhwa Broadcasting Corp (MBC) (Korea)
 Best Social Awareness Programme : "Unanswered Questions – Single Young Fathers" by Seoul Broadcasting System, Channel 6 (Korea)
 Best Comedy Programme : "The Ghost Doctor" by Scenario Co. Ltd., Modern Nine TV, Channel 9 (Thailand)
 Best Entertainment (One-off/Annual) : "Hong Kong Disneyland Grand Opening Special" by Walt Disney Television International (Asia Pacific), Television Broadcast Ltd (Hong Kong), Jade Channel (Hong Kong)
 Best Entertainment Programme : "The Man’s World Show #1" by SPE Networks – Asia Pte Ltd, AXN Asia (Singapore)
 Best Drama Series : "A Love To Kill" by Korean Broadcasting System, KBS TV2 (Korea)
 Best Docu-drama : "Voice Recorder" by Tokyo Broadcasting System Inc, Tokyo Broadcasting System Television Inc (Japan)
 Best Reality Programme : "Real Situations Saturday – Changing our Child’s Behaviour" by Seoul Broadcasting System, Channel 6 (Korea)
 Best Game or Quiz Programme : "NEP League" by Fuji Television Network Inc (Japan)
 Best Music Programme : "Leo & Miriam Special 2005" by Television Broadcasts Limited, TVB, Jade Channel
 Best Talk Show : "Republic Benar – Benar Mabok (BBM)" by PT. Indosiar Visual Mandiri, Indosiar (Indonesia)
 Best Live Event Coverage : "Hunger Deaths" by New Delhi Television Limited, NDTV 24x7 (India)
 Best Children's Programme : "Todsagun Kid Game" by Workpoint Entertainment Public Company Ltd, Modern Nine, Channel 9 (Thailand)
 Best Infotainment Programme : "Where the Queue Starts" by MediaCorp Pte Ltd, MediaCorp TV Channel 8 (Singapore)
 Best Animation : "Republic Benar – Benar Mabok (BBM)" by PT. Indosiar Visual Mandiri, Indosiar (Indonesia)
 Best Single Drama/Telemovie : "Hiroshima – August 6th 1945" by Tokyo Broadcasting System, Inc, TBS, Channel 6 (Japan)

Performance
 Best News Presenter or Anchor : Kristie Lu Stout for "CNN Today" by CNN International (Hong Kong)
 Best Current Affairs Presenter : Stan Grant for "Pakistan Earthquake Rising From The Ruins" by CNN International (Hong Kong)
 Best Entertainment Presenter : Phanya Nirunkul for "Todsagun Kid Game" Workpoint Entertainment Public Company Ltd, Modern Nine, Channel 9 (Thailand)
 Best Drama Performance by an Actor : Mathialagan M for "Accidental Accident – Padigal (6 Stages of life)" Blue River Pictures Pte Ltd, MediaCorp TV12, Vasantham Central (Singapore)
 Best Drama Performance by an Actress : Phiyada Akkraseranee for "Hua Jai Chocolate (Heart Of Chocolate)" Scenario Co Ltd, Royal Thai Army Television, Channel 5 (Thailand)
 Best Comedy Performance by an Actor : Michael V for "Bubble Gang GMA Network Inc" (Philippines)
 Best Comedy Performance by an Actress : Janet Khoo for "Mat Dom Teksi" Double Vision Sdn Bhd, Radio Television Malaysia, RTM 1 (Malaysia)

2007

Programming

Performance

Technical

2008

Programming

Performance

Technical

2009

Programming

Performance

Technical

2010

Programming

Performance

Technical & Creative Categories

2011

Programming

Performance

Technical & Creative Categories

2012

Programming

Performance

Technical & Creative Categories

Acting award winners
Best Actor in a Leading Role
 2009: Adrian Pang for Red Thread
 2010: Bowie Lam for Sister of Pearl 
 2011: Kevin Cheng for Ghetto Justice
 2012: Moses Chan for When Heaven Burns
 2013: Chris Wu for Emerging Light
 2014: Pierre Png for Zero Calling
 2015: Zhang Jia-Yi for Forty-nine Days Memory
 2019: William Hsieh for First Love

Best Actress in a Leading Role
 2009: Michelle Yim for Moonlight Resonance 
 2010: Rebecca Lim for The Pupil
 2011: Charmaine Sheh for Can't Buy Me Love
 2012: Rui En for Unriddle 2
 2013: Jade Chou for Falling
 2014: Puteri Balqis Azizi for Balqis
 2015: Zhou Xun for Red Sorghum
 2019: Tisanart Sornsuek for True Life of a Drama Queen

Best Actor in a Supporting Role
 2010: Lim Kay Tong for The Pupil
 2011: Mak Cheung Ching for No Regrets
 2012: Lucas Luo for Man • Boy
 2013: Jeffrey Xu for Marry Me
 2014: Rayson Tan for Entangled
 2015: Lim Kay-Tong for Grace
	
Best Actress in a Supporting Role
 2010: Susan Tse for Beyond the Realm of Conscience
 2011: Fala Chen for No Regrets
 2012: Nancy Wu for Gloves Come Off
 2013: Aileen Tan for The Day It Rained on Our Parade
 2014: Hsieh Chiung-Hsuan for Lonely River
 2015: Nusba Punnakanta for The Secret Truth
 2016: Tien Hsin for A Touch of Green

Best Comedy Performance by an Actor/Actress
 2009: Chusak Iamsuk for Raberd Thurd Theung
 2010: Chua En Lai for The Noose 3
 2011: Suhaimi Yusof for The Noose Season 4
 2012: Michelle Chong for The Noose Season 5
 2013: Chua En Lai for The Noose
 2014: Irene Ang for Spouse For House
 2015: Ivana Wong for Come On, Cousin

26th Asian Television Awards 
In light of the recent COVID-19 pandemic, the Asian Television Awards adapted into digital formats. Having started its very first online show for the 25th Asian Television Awards in 2021, the 26th edition was again held in an online format in December 10 and 11, 2021.

Performance category - Nominees

27th Asian Television Awards

References

External links
 Official website
 Media Development Authority – Singapore
 TODAY Online
 OnScreeen Asia
 Journal Online
 Yahoo News
 Asia Media Festival
 Channel NewsAsia
 GMA News
 Philippines Entertainment Portal
 xinmsn

Singaporean television awards
Awards established in 1996